Kate Hardie (born Kate Louise Oddie; 26 April 1968) is an English actress. She is best known for her roles in The Krays, Mona Lisa and the 2016 Channel 4 original series National Treasure. Hardie's stage name is derived from those of both her parents: Jean Hart and Bill Oddie.

Career
With no formal training, she auditioned for her first role, in the 1983 film Runners (written by Stephen Poliakoff and directed by Charles Sturridge), at the age of 14, telling her parents she had done so only when she had the part. She went on to appear in numerous films, including Revolution (1985), Neil Jordan's Mona Lisa (1986), Cry Freedom (1987), Tree of Hands (1989), The Krays (1990), Jack and Sarah (1995), Croupier (1998) and I Am Dina (2002).

On television her roles include the episode The Man Upstairs (1988) [S02 E05] of The Ray Bradbury Theater series, The Men's Room, Safe in which she was nominated for the Royal Television Society Best TV performer, and Beyond Reason. She spent five months in Hollywood before returning to the UK to play the student nurse Karen O'Malley in the BBC drama series Casualty. In 1998, she starred in Croupier.

In 2006, she graduated in screen writing at the National Film and Television School. She wrote the short film King of London during her time there. She subsequently wrote two plays in Channel 4's Coming Up series, Imprints (2007) and Little Bill Um (2008), the latter also being her directorial debut.

In 2009, she appeared in the BBC drama Criminal Justice.

In 2011, she wrote and directed a short film called Shoot Me starring Claire Skinner and Paul Andrew Williams and produced by Rankin.

Personal life
Hardie left school and home in Hampstead, North London, to live with a boy when she was 14. She later lived with the actor Dorian Healy for six years. She met the portrait and fashion photographer Rankin (John Rankin Waddell) on a photo shoot, and married him in 1995. After their son was born, she moved in with a fellow actor, David Thewlis, and divorced Rankin in 1998. Her relationship with Thewlis subsequently ended.

References

External links

Interview

1968 births
Living people
20th-century English actresses
21st-century English actresses
Actresses from London
Alumni of the National Film and Television School
English dramatists and playwrights
English film actresses
English television actresses
People from Hampstead